Grass Wonder (foaled 18 February 1995) is an American-bred, Japanese-trained Thoroughbred racehorse and sire. In a racing career which lasted from 1997 until 2000 he won nine of his fifteen races including four Grade I races. He was the leading juvenile colt in Japan in 1997 when he was unbeaten in four races, culminating in a victory in the Asahi Hai Sansai Stakes. He missed most of his second season with injury problems but returned in autumn to win the Arima Kinen. He reached his peak as a four-year-old when he won the Takarazuka Kinen and a second Arima Kinen. He failed to win in three races in 2000 and was retired to stud. He has had some success as a breeding stallion.

Background
Grass Wonder is a chestnut horse with a white star, standing 15.3½ hands high bred in Kentucky by Phillips Racing Partnership & John Phillips, of the Darby Dan Farm. He was sired by Silver Hawk, an American-bred colt who finished third in the 1982 Epsom Derby and later became a successful breeding stallion, siring the 1997 Epsom Derby winner Benny the Dip, the 1999 St Leger winner Mutafaweq and the leading American turf performer Hawkster. Grass Wonder's dam Ameriflora was an unraced daughter of Danzig. She was a great-granddaughter of Soaring, an American broodmare who was the ancestor of many major winners including Glorious Song, Saint Ballado, Rahy and Singspiel.

The yearling was consigned to the Keeneland sale in September 1996 and was bought for $250,000 by Nobuo Tsunoda. Grass Wonder was exported to Japan where he was trained by Mitsuhiro Ogata and was ridden in most of his races by Hitoshi Matoba.

Racing career

1997: two-year-old season
Grass Wonder began his racing by defeating nine opponents in a maiden race over 1800 metres at Nakayama Racecourse on 13 September 1997. A month later he followed up in the Ivy Stakes over 1400 metres at Tokyo Racecourse, winning from Machikane Sanshiro. In November he was moved up in class for the Grade II Keisei Hai Sansai Stakes over the same course and distance and won from Machikane Sanshiro and Courir Cyclone. On his final start of the season, Grass Wonder was one of fifteen colts to contest Japan's most prestigious race for juveniles, the Asahi Hai Sansai Stakes over 1600 metres at Nakayama on 7 December. Ridden by Matoba, he won by two and a half lengths from Meiner Love (later to win the Sprinters Stakes) who took second ahead of Figaro and Agnes World.

In January 1998, Grass Wonder was voted Japanese Champion 2-Year-Old Colt at the JRA Awards.

1998: three-year-old season
As a foreign-bred horse, Grass Wonder was not eligible to race in many of the major Japanese races for three-year-olds, and when he sustained a leg injury in March 1998 it was decided to reserve him for an autumn campaign. He made his first appearance of the year he finished fifth behind Silence Suzuka in the Grade II Mainichi Okan over 1800 metres at Tokyo in October. In the following month he was moved up in distance for the Grade II Copa Republica Argentina over 2500 metres at Tokyo and finished sixth behind Yusei Top Run.

Despite his lack of form in 1998, Grass Wonder was one of sixteen horses selected to run in the Arima Kinen over 2500 metres at Nakayama on 27 December. His opponents included Air Groove (Yushun Himba, Tenno Sho (autumn)), Machikane Fukukitaru (Kikuka Sho), Mejiro Bright (Tenno Sho (spring)), Mejiro Dober (Shuka Sho, Queen Elizabeth II Commemorative Cup), Offside Trap (Tenno Sho (autumn)), Seiun Sky (Satsuki Sho, Kikuka Sho), Silk Justice (Defending Champion), Stay Gold and Yusei Top Run. Grass Wonder won by half a length from Mejiro Bright with a gap of two and a half lengths back to Stay Gold who took third place ahead of Seiun Sky.

1999: four-year-old season

Grass Wonder began his third season in the Grade II Keio Hai Spring Cup over 1400 metres at Tokyo on 15 May. He won by three quarters of a length from Air Jihad, to whom he was conceding four pounds. The unplaced horses included Phalaenopsis (Oka Sho, Shuka Sho) and the Godolphin challenger Lend A Hand (Gran Criterium). On June 13 over 1600 metres Grass Wonder faced Air Jihad at level weights in the Yasuda Kinen. He was beaten a nose by his rival with the pair finishing two and a half lengths clear of Seeking The Pearl (Prix Maurice de Gheest) in third place. Grass Wonder returned to middle distances for the Takarazuka Kinen over 2200 metres at Hanshin Racecourse on 11 July and was matched for the first time against Special Week a colt who had won the Tokyo Yushun in 1998 and the spring edition of the Tenno Sho. The other runners included Matikanefukukitaru and Stay Gold. Grass Wonder defeated Special Week with a gap of seven lengths back to Stay Gold in third.

After a break of almost three months, Grass Wonder returned for the Grade II Mainichi Okan over 1800 metres at Tokyo on 10 October and won from Meisho Odo and Embrasser Moi. On 26 December at Nakayama, Grass Wonder attempted to become the fourth horse following Speed Symboli, Symboli Rudolf and Oguri Cap to win back-to-back runnings of the Arima Kinen. His main opponents in the fourteen runner field included Mejiro Bright, Narita Top Road (Kikuka Sho), Phalaenopsis, Special Week, Stay Gold, Symboli Indy (NHK Mile Cup) and T M Opera O (Satsuki Sho). The race produced a dramatic finish with the lead changing hand several times in the last 200 metres, but Grass Wonder prevailed by a nose and a neck from Special Week and T M Opera O with Tsurumaru Tsuyoshi half a length away in fourth.

For his efforts over the course of the season, Grass Wonder was given a special award at the JRA Awards for 1999.

2000: five-year-old season
Grass Wonder remained in training as a five-year-old colt but failed to reproduce his best form. He finished sixth behind Leo Ryuho in the Grade II Nikkei Sho over 2500 metres at Nakayama on 26 March and then ran unplaced behind the filly Stinger in the Keio Hai Spring Cup. In his final race the horse ran for the second time in the Takarazuka Kinen and finished sixth of the eleven runners behind T M Opera O.

Stud record

Grass Wonder was retired from racing to stand at the Shadai Stallion Station in Hokkaido. He later moved to the Breeders' Stallion Station where he was based in 2015.

The best of his offspring have included:

 Sakura Mega Wonder (2003), won seven race including the Kinko Sho
 Screen Hero (2004), won five races including the Japan Cup
 Earnestly (foaled 2005), won 10 races including the Takarazuka Kinen
 Seiun Wonder (2006), won 4 races including the Asahi Hai Futurity Stakes

Pedigree

References 

1995 racehorse births
Racehorses bred in Kentucky
Racehorses trained in Japan
Thoroughbred family 12-c